Artem Vladimirovich Zhmurko (born 10 October 1985) is a Russian cross-country skier who has competed between 2008 and 2017. His lone World Cup victory was in a 15 km + 15 km double pursuit event in Russia in January 2010.

Zhmurko also has two victories in lesser events, earning them in 2008 and 2009 respectively.

Cross-country skiing results
All results are sourced from the International Ski Federation (FIS).

World Cup

Season standings

Individual podiums
1 victory – (1 ) 
1 podium – (1 )

References

External links

1985 births
Living people
Russian male cross-country skiers
Tour de Ski skiers
Universiade medalists in cross-country skiing
Universiade gold medalists for Russia
Competitors at the 2009 Winter Universiade
Sportspeople from Kemerovo Oblast